Stadionul Municipal is a multi-use stadium in Turnu Măgurele, Romania. It is used mostly for football matches and is the home ground of Cetatea Turnu Măgurele. The stadium holds 2,000 people. Between 2017 and 2018 the stadium was completely renovated with an investment of 3 million€.

References

Football venues in Romania
Buildings and structures in Teleorman County
Turnu Măgurele